Lansing is the capital of the U.S. state of Michigan.

Lansing may also refer to:

Places

United States
Lansing, Florida, an unincorporated community
Lansing, Illinois, a village
Lansing, Iowa, a city in Lansing Township
Lansing, Kansas, a city
Lansing, New York, a town
Lansing (village), New York, a village in the town
Lansing, North Carolina, a town
Lansing, Ohio, an unincorporated community
Lansing, Salem, Oregon, a neighborhood of Salem
Lansing, West Virginia, an unincorporated community
Lansing Township, Allamakee County, Iowa
Lansing Township, Mower County, Minnesota
Lansing Charter Township, Michigan
Lake Lansing, Michigan
Roman Catholic Diocese of Lansing, Michigan

Canada
Lansing, Toronto, Ontario, a neighbourhood
former name of Willowdale, Toronto

Other uses
Lansing (name)
USS Lansing (DE-388), a U.S. Navy destroyer escort named after William Henry Lansing
Altec Lansing, a line of audio products
Lansing Bagnall, British former forklift manufacturer
Lansing Oldsmobile, an American football team (1919–1920, returned in 1922 as the Durants, 1922–1923)

See also
Lansing Man, prehistoric human remains found near Lansing, Kansas
Lancing (disambiguation)